"Chris Has Got a Date, Date, Date, Date, Date" is the fifth episode of the fifteenth season of the animated sitcom Family Guy, and the 274th episode overall. It aired on Fox in the United States on November 6, 2016, and is written by Artie Johann and directed by Brian Iles. The episode title is a play on the lyrics of the Taylor Swift song "Shake It Off". The episode sees Chris getting a date with Swift.

Plot
In Brian's Prius, Peter takes Chris and Meg to school. In the school's hallway, Neil tells Chris he's taking Vice-Principal Brenda Maguire to the upcoming school dance, explaining that she's now single since her husband died from ALS. Chris asks Kara Morris to the dance - only for her to shoot him down and call him that robot from Big Hero 6. As Kara leaves, Chris states that the robot's name is Baymax.

After Chris is rejected by every girl that he has asked to the dance, Stewie tells him about singer Taylor Swift, who Chris is completely ignorant about. As the conversation snowballs, Stewie suggests that he ask Taylor to the dance. Stewie makes an internet video as a means to ask her out, but Chris reveals that he made his own video and asked her simply out of the blue. She posts a reply video that says she accepts, elating Chris and Stewie. Chris's date with Taylor makes its way to the local news and the Griffin family is excited at meeting Taylor when she arrives at their house to meet Chris before they head off to the dance.

Meanwhile, as Peter is goofing off in Brian's car, a businessman enters and sits down in the back seat. Assuming Peter is his Uber driver, since the car is a Prius, he hands him 20 dollars for his fare. Seeing an opportunity, Peter impersonates an Uber driver. After this encounter, he decides that he wants to be a real Uber driver and heads over to their office to apply. While filling out an application, he finds out just what little is required for the job. Hired on the spot, he turns out to be a horrible Uber driver. Peter sees an opportunity to take care of a "few" errands and "quick" stops while taking one of his fares to the airport.

After Taylor arrives, the Griffins make a good first impression (save for Brian and Meg, who are presumptuous at her movie casting choices). Taylor enjoys her time with Chris at the school dance, and during a walk in the park, the couple kiss. The next day, Brian finds a music video called "The Boy in the Giant Tux" on Bonnie Swanson's Facebook page that features Taylor mocking, insulting, and making fun of Chris. The video portrays Taylor as a heartbroken girl lashing out at Chris for the way he behaved during their dance date. Brian and Stewie resolve to talk to Taylor in her Rhode Island mansion. When Brian, Chris, and Stewie arrive, she reveals that she sabotages all her relationships "with nice guys...and John Mayer" so that she can get a lot of material for her songs. Taylor invites Chris to her concert to make it up to him.

During one of his drives, Peter's fare directs him to turn down a dark alley, where a group of Italian-accented taxicab drivers are there waiting for him. The fare explains why he led him here, and they begin mercilessly beating him. Turns out that the beating is just because he is an Uber driver, and they don't tolerate competition. Peter manages to shield himself with a Judd Hirsch medallion. As he's going into details about the fabricated story of how he obtained it, his fare burns Brian's Prius.

At her next concert, Taylor plays a song called "Me, Taylor" about falling in love with Chris but is booed because she's too happy. Realizing Taylor lacks inspiration for her art, Chris breaks up with her and insults her to make her angry again so she can gain back her fans. A now elated Taylor smiles then goes back onstage to loud applause when she promises to deliver one of her trademark breakup songs. As Chris, Brian, and Stewie leave the concert, their Uber driver arrives. It's Peter, beaten badly as he rolls up in Brian's now burnt and smoking Prius.

At the Griffin house, Lois mentions that Uber is a great job to have despite the fact that Peter got assaulted. As Chris talks about his experience with Taylor, Peter breaks the fourth wall by pretending to be a late night talk-show host, complete with the compulsory desk. He ends the show in a live episode-esque manner by pointing out the stars, guest stars, and Cleveland Brown and his House Band. Peter apologizes for being unable to get the Greased-Up Deaf Guy to appear. He wraps up by stating that the guests next week will be Amanda Peet and Dom Irrera. The camera zooms out to reveal the live studio audience they're performing in front of.

Reception
The episode was watched by an audience of 2.6 million viewers, an increase from the previous episode, and making it the second most-watched show of the night, behind The Simpsons.

References

External links
 

2016 American television episodes
Family Guy (season 15) episodes